Rotsea is a hamlet in the East Riding of Yorkshire, England.

It forms part of the civil parish of Hutton Cranswick.

The parish recreation ground, which is home to all Hutton Cranswick football teams including the successful Hutton Cranswick United football club, is based near to Rotsea and the ground is known as Rotsea Lane.

References

Villages in the East Riding of Yorkshire